Astroblepus guentheri is a carnivorous species of catfish of the family Astroblepidae. It can be found in rainforest streams in the basin of the Magdalena-Cauca rivers and in some Pacific slope rivers in Colombia. It is an uncommon and not well studied species.

Although patronym not identified but clearly in honor of ichthyologist-herpetologist Albert Günther (1830-1914), British Museum (Natural History), where the type specimen is housed.

References

Bibliography
Eschmeyer, William N., ed. 1998. Catalog of Fishes. Special Publication of the Center for Biodiversity Research and Information, num. 1, vol. 1–3. California Academy of Sciences. San Francisco, California, United States. 2905. .

Astroblepus
Taxa named by George Albert Boulenger
Fish described in 1887
Freshwater fish of Colombia